BBBB may refer to:
 Bill Bailey's Birdwatching Bonanza, a British television game show
 Big Bad Beetleborgs, an American television series aired from 1996 to 1998
 Big Brother's Big Brain, a live discussion program that aired in 2006 and 2007
 Blackboard Inc., NASDAQ symbol BBBB, a Washington, D.C. software company
 "Brick by Boring Brick", a song by the American band Paramore

See also
 4B (disambiguation)
 B4 (disambiguation)
 BBB (disambiguation)
 BB (disambiguation)
 B (disambiguation)